Richard Dickson (Ric) Reid (born 20 November 1969 in Auckland) is a New Zealand road cyclist who competed for New Zealand in the road race events at the 1994 Commonwealth Games and the  1996 Summer Olympics.

External links 
 
 

1969 births
Living people
New Zealand male cyclists
Olympic cyclists of New Zealand
Cyclists at the 1996 Summer Olympics
Cyclists at the 1994 Commonwealth Games
Commonwealth Games competitors for New Zealand
Cyclists from Auckland
Road racing cyclists
20th-century New Zealand people